was a Japanese manga artist born in Fukuchiyama, Kyoto, Japan.

He is best known for his 1990 debut manga , for which he won the 1992 Kodansha Manga Award for general manga and the 1998 Tezuka Osamu Cultural Prize Award for Excellence.

Takahiro Kochi was his assistant.

Adaptations
His novel Tōgenkyō no hito-bito was adapted into the 2002 Japanese comedy film Shangri-La directed by Takashi Miike.

References

External links

Profile  at The Ultimate Manga Page

1945 births
2003 deaths
Manga artists from Kyoto Prefecture
Winner of Kodansha Manga Award (General)